Lukyanovo is a rural locality (a village) in Vasilyevskoye Rural Settlement, Vashkinsky District, Vologda Oblast, Russia. The population was 88 as of 2002. There are 2 streets.

Geography 
Lukyanovo is located 4 km northeast of Lipin Bor (the district's administrative centre) by road. Zarechny is the nearest rural locality.

References 

Rural localities in Vashkinsky District